Pelican Marsh is a census-designated place (CDP) in northwestern Collier County, Florida, United States. U.S. Route 41 (Tamiami Trail) forms the western edge of the community.

Pelican Marsh was first listed as a CDP prior to the 2020 census.

Demographics

References 

Census-designated places in Collier County, Florida
Census-designated places in Florida